Joshua Eric Sawyer (born October 18, 1975), more commonly known and credited as Josh Sawyer, J.E. Sawyer, or JSawyer, is an American video game designer, known for his work on role-playing video games.

Early life and education
Sawyer grew up in Fort Atkinson, Wisconsin, and is the son of Linda Sawyer and sculptor Gerald P. Sawyer. He is of German ancestry. He earned a BA degree from Lawrence University in Appleton, Wisconsin. In addition to being a history major, Sawyer participated in the theater (including mounting a production of Assassins). After Lawrence, Sawyer moved to California.

Career
Starting as a web designer at Black Isle Studios in 1999, Sawyer quickly worked his way up the ladder to an associate designer position and then lead designer on Icewind Dale II. While at Black Isle he was known for coming up with the "Ex-Presidents" project naming system.

In November 2003 Sawyer announced his departure from Black Isle, where he had been serving as lead designer of Fallout 3, to pursue other projects. Interplay went on to close Black Isle two weeks after Sawyer's departure.

On July 19, 2005, GameSpot reported that he had left Midway's Gauntlet: Seven Sorrows, and was accepting a position at Obsidian Entertainment, a studio founded and staffed by many veterans of Black Isle. His first role was as the lead designer for Neverwinter Nights 2.

He later acted as the project director and lead designer of Fallout: New Vegas. In December 2011 Sawyer publicly released a New Vegas mod designed for his own personal use adding a large variety of small tweaks to the game ranging from rebalancing the karma of certain characters to slowing down the level up speed. As of November 2012, this mod has been updated to version 5.1.

He also served as the project director and lead designer on the Aliens RPG. Sega, the game's publisher, subsequently canceled the project, resulting in layoffs at Obsidian. According to Obsidian CEO Feargus Urquhart, the game - titled Aliens: Crucible - "looked and felt like it was ready to ship".

In 2012, with Obsidian on the brink of financial disaster after the cancellation of another project by a publisher, Sawyer proposed the company return to its design roots by making an isometric RPG in the style of those created at Black Isle. Arguing there was a market for this type of game among fans, Sawyer suggested turning to the platform Kickstarter to secure funding for development without a publisher. He succeeded in persuading company leadership, and the resulting game, Pillars of Eternity, met its Kickstarter funding goal of 1.1 million dollars in 27 hours. It ultimately raised nearly four million dollars, setting a Kickstarter record at the time. Sawyer later served as director and narrative designer on its sequel, Pillars of Eternity II: Deadfire, which was also crowdfunded and released in 2018.

Games

References

External links
Josh Sawyer at MobyGames

1975 births
American people of German descent
American video game designers
American video game directors
Black Isle Studios
Dungeons & Dragons video game designers
Fallout (series) developers
Interplay Entertainment people
Lawrence University alumni
Living people
Obsidian Entertainment people
People from Fort Atkinson, Wisconsin
Web designers